George Balfour may refer to:

 George Balfour (Conservative politician) (1872–1941), British Conservative Party politician and engineer
 George Balfour (Liberal MP) (1809–1894), British Army officer and Liberal politician
 George William Balfour (1823–1903), Scottish physician